New World Orphans is the seventh studio album by American rock band Hed PE. Released on January 13, 2009, it is the band's fourth album on Suburban Noize.

Music and lyrics 

New World Orphans was influenced by Suicidal Tendencies and Minor Threat. The album's sound fuses heavy metal, hip hop and punk rock; it also includes elements of hardcore punk, funk and reggae. The album's lyrics derive from the 9/11 Truth movement, criticism of George W. Bush, the existence of extraterrestrial life, the economy and the Iraq War.

Background 
Hed PE had been working on the album since before the release of The D.I.Y. Guys with front man Jared Gomes notifying it through various MySpace posts. Three studio recorded tracks rumored to be on New World Orphans, "War on the Middle Class", "Ordo (ab Chao)", and "Bloodfire", were released via the live CD/DVD combo set, The D.I.Y. Guys on July 8, 2008. The tracks were rough versions of what would later appear on the album.

On November 4, 2008 the band released the music video for "Ordo (ab Chao)" via the band's MySpace. The video showed a different mix than that of the version released on The D.I.Y. Guys, including new instrumentation such as a melodica during the verses. On November 25, 2008, New World Orphans second single, "Renegade", premiered online on the band's official Facebook account. A video for the song was produced, and premiered on December 20. It was directed by Philip Carrer and Chad Archibald and produced by Lee Hartney of the Smith Street Band for Guelph's premiere film production studio Black Fawn Film alongside film collective Bleeding Apple. Drummer Chris Hendrich appears in the "Renegade" music video with the band.

On November 19, 2008 the official track listing and album artwork were revealed. The album was released in three different color variations of the cover: black, red and white. Each version features exclusive tracks corresponding to their version color. The artwork and final track listing were officially posted via the album's official promotional website.

New World Orphans also features guest collaborations including Suburban Noize Records' Kottonmouth Kings and The Dirtball, and Strange Music's Tech N9ne.

As with all post Jive Records albums, New World Orphans was produced by Jared Gomes.

Reception 

New World Orphans debuted at 72 on the Billboard 200, their first inside 100 since Blackout. The album also peaked no. 5 on the Top Internet albums as well as no. 4 on the Top Independent albums.

Track listing

Personnel 

(Hed) Planet Earth
 Jahred Gomes - vocals, melodica
 Jaxon - guitar
 DJ Product © 1969 - turntables, melodica, vocals
 Mawk (Mark Young) - bass
 Tiny Bubz - drums, percussion
 Jeremiah «Trauma» Stratton - drums, percussion on "Here and Now"

Production
Produced by Jahred Gomes, Brad Xavier & Kevin Zinger
Management by Kevin Zinger & Ivory Daniel (The Regime)
Art direction by Casey Quintal & Hed PE
Design by Casey Quintal
Pyramid by Jaxon

Charts

References 

2009 albums
Hed PE albums
Suburban Noize Records albums